The White Bird Grade is a historic mountain highway along a former section of U.S. Route 95 near White Bird, Idaho, United States. It is listed on the National Register of Historic Places as an engineering accomplishment, a "marvel" which was an achievement of the early good roads movement.

The highway in Idaho County was built  in 1920 and upgraded through 1938.

The contract for the original road,  from the mouth of White Bird Creek at the Salmon River to Grangeville, was awarded in late 1918. Located to the east, the old road was twice the length and had a multitude of switchbacks ascending 

Farmers kept water troughs at a few of the precarious switchbacks for their livestock and folks who frequently traveled the road knew their exact locations, as they were a welcome stop for over-heated cars. Some log trucks would exit the newN US95 in White Bird and take the old narrow, switchback riddled US 95 since the grade was spread out over about 4 extra miles making it much easier on those trucks hauling heavy loads over the grade. There is an annual charity "Just For the Hill of It" bike challenge up the old White Bird Grade.

See also
White Bird Hill Summit

References

Roads on the National Register of Historic Places in Idaho
Idaho County, Idaho
1920 establishments in Idaho
U.S. Highways in Idaho
U.S. Route 95